Paragorgopis stheno is a species of ulidiid or picture-winged fly in the genus Paragorgopis of the family Ulidiidae.

References

stheno
Insects described in 2004